Seán Loftus may refer to:

 Seán Dublin Bay Rockall Loftus (1927–2010), Irish environmentalist, barrister and politician
 Seán Loftus (hurler), Irish hurler